Ports-sur-Vienne (literally Ports on Vienne; previously known as Ports until February 2020) is a commune in the Indre-et-Loire department in central France.

Population
The inhabitants are called Portais or Portaises.

See also
Communes of the Indre-et-Loire department

References

Communes of Indre-et-Loire